Artscape Nordland (Skulpturlandskap Nordland) is an international art project that aims to bring art to people where they live, art museums being few and far apart in the sparsely populated county of Nordland.

The project currently includes 33 sculptures by 33 artists from 18 different countries placed in 32 municipalities in Nordland plus 1 in Troms.

The project has been celebrated by the composers Kari Beate Tandberg and Karsten Brustad who working together wrote «Skulpturlandskap Nordland – en musikalsk dialog» ("Artscape Nordland: a musical dialogue").

Participating Municipalities in Nordland 
Alstahaug
Andøy
Ballangen
Beiarn
Bodø
Brønnøy
Bø
Evenes
Fauske
Flakstad
Gildeskål
Hadsel
Hamarøy
Hattfjelldal
Leirfjord
Lødingen
Meløy
Moskenes
Narvik
Rana
Røst
Saltdal
Skjerstad
Sortland
Sømna
Tjeldsund
Vefsn
Vega
Vestvågøy
Vevelstad
Vågan
Øksnes

Participating Municipalities in Troms 
Skånland

External links 
Artscape Nordland
 Artscape at Google Cultural Institute

Culture in Nordland
Culture in Troms
Tourist attractions in Nordland